S. Nagarajan is an Indian politician and is Member of the Legislative Assembly of Tamil Nadu. He was elected to the Tamil Nadu legislative assembly as an All India Anna Dravida Munnetra Kazhagam candidate from Manamadurai constituency in the by-election in 2019.

See also
TANSI land acquisition case

References 

Living people
All India Anna Dravida Munnetra Kazhagam politicians
Members of the Tamil Nadu Legislative Assembly
Year of birth missing (living people)
Indian politicians convicted of corruption